Giada Colombo (born 23 March 1992) is an Italian female rower, medal winner at senior level at the European Rowing Championships.

References

External links
 

1992 births
Living people
Italian female rowers
Rowers at the 2010 Summer Youth Olympics